Lucyna Kornobys (born 17 February 1978) is a Polish Paralympic athlete competing in discus throw, javelin throw and shot put events. She represented Poland at the 2016 Summer Paralympics held in Rio de Janeiro, Brazil and she won the silver medal in the women's shot put F34 event. She also won the silver medal in the women's shot put F34 event at the 2020 Summer Paralympics in Tokyo, Japan.

Career 

At the 2018 World Para Athletics European Championships held in Berlin, Germany, she won the gold medal in the women's shot put F33 event with a new world record of 7.49 m. She also won the bronze medal in the women's javelin throw F34 event with a new world record of 16.22 m.

In July 2019, she set a new world record in the women's discus throw F33 and women's javelin throw F33 events at the World Para Athletics Grand Prix in Bydgoszcz, Poland.

At the 2019 World Para Athletics Championships held in Dubai, United Arab Emirates, she won the gold medal in the women's shot put F33 event. She also won the bronze medal in the women's javelin throw F34 event. She set new world records in both events.

Achievements

References

External links 
 

Living people
Athletes (track and field) at the 2016 Summer Paralympics
Athletes (track and field) at the 2020 Summer Paralympics
Medalists at the 2016 Summer Paralympics
Medalists at the 2020 Summer Paralympics
Paralympic silver medalists for Poland
Polish female discus throwers
Polish female javelin throwers
Polish female shot putters
Paralympic athletes of Poland
World record holders in Paralympic athletics
World Para Athletics Championships winners
Paralympic medalists in athletics (track and field)
Medalists at the World Para Athletics European Championships
1978 births
People from Kamienna Góra
21st-century Polish women